"Whatzupwitu" (pronounced "what's up with you") is a 1993 R&B song by Eddie Murphy, featuring Michael Jackson. It is included as the sixth track on Murphy's third studio album Love's Alright. Jackson decided to participate in the song and video since he thought the lyrics had a positive message.

Critical reception
AllMusic editor Steven McDonald wrote that despite being a featured artist, Jackson "steals 'Whatzupwitu' outright."

Music video
"Whatzupwitu" has been noted for its music video, directed by Wayne Isham and Klasky Csupo, which was inspired by the album's cover art and also uses computer graphics. This followed Murphy's guest appearance in Jackson's music video for "Remember the Time". It was voted by MTV viewers in 1999 as the third worst music video of all time, and permanently retired on the channel from being aired in its entirety on the MTV special 25 Lame. The beginning of the video features Murphy looking through a puddle of water. In the puddle, there is a sad clown that says, "The elephant is dying." Then, there is an animated scene of three elephants standing on top of a sea turtle while holding the Earth on their backs. The scene changes to Murphy singing over various special effects over a blue sky, before Jackson appears and begins to sing along with him. The music video also features the Harlem Boys Choir singing and dancing around them.

Track listings

Charts

References

External links
Official music video
Segment on the making of the video

1993 songs
1993 singles
Eddie Murphy songs
Michael Jackson songs
Motown singles
Music videos directed by Wayne Isham
Male vocal duets